The following is a timeline of the history of the city of Oakland, Alameda County, California, United States.

19th century

 1852 – Town of Oakland incorporated.
 1854 – Horace Carpentier elected mayor.
 1855 – Lyceum founded.
 1860 – Population: 1,543.
 1863 – Heald's Business College established.
 1864 – Vander Naillen School of Practical Engineering established.
 1866 – Police Court established.
 1868
 Oakland Evening Transcript newspaper begins publication.
 University of California and Oakland Library Association established.
 Oakland Long Wharf bought by Central Pacific Railroad.
 1869
 Railway begins operating.
 Lake Merritt Wild-Fowl Sanctuary and Oakland Fire Department established.
 Oakland Long Wharf becomes the western terminus of the First transcontinental railroad.
 1871 – Mills Seminary relocates to Oakland.
 1872
 Brooklyn becomes part of Oakland.
 Theosophical Society Library founded.
 1873 – University of California relocates to Berkeley.
 1875 – Oakland Daily Evening Tribune newspaper in publication.
 1878 – Oakland Free Library opens.
 1880 – Population: 34,456.
 1884 – Horton School established.
 1899 – Oakland Conservatory of Music established.
 1900 – Population: 66,960.

20th century

 1904 – Pacific Technical College established.
 1906 – April 18: San Francisco earthquake; refugees flee to Oakland.
 1907 – California School of Arts and Crafts founded.
 1909
 Samuel Merritt College founded.
 Moore & Scott Iron Works in business.
 1910
 Oakland Public Museum and YMCA open.
 Population: 150,174.
 1912 – Oakland School Women's Club and Children's Hospital founded.
 1913 – Oakland Yacht Club established.
 1914
 Oakland Technical High School established.
 Oakland City Hall and Civic Auditorium built.
 1917 – Joaquin Miller Park established.
 1920 – Population: 216,261.
 1922 – Snow Museum of Natural History opens.
 1923 – Tribune Tower completed.
 1924 – Granada Theater opens.
 1927
 Oakland Airport begins operating.
 Port of Oakland opens.
 1928
 Clorox Chemical Company in business.
 Posey Tube (traffic tunnel) built.
 1931 – Paramount Theatre built.
 1933 – Oakland Symphony active.
 1936
 San Francisco–Oakland Bay Bridge opens.
 Alameda County Courthouse built.
 Alameda County Botanical and Zoological Society established.
 1937 – Caldecott Tunnel opens.
 1940 – Population: 302,163.
 1944 – Oakland Army Base active.
 1946 – 1946 Oakland General Strike begins on December 3 and ends on December 5.
 1954 – Oakland Junior College established.
 1961 – Coliseum Drive-In opens.
 1966
 October: Black Panther Party established.
 Oakland Coliseum opens.
 1968 – Athletics baseball team relocates to Oakland.
 1969 – Oakland Museum opens.
 1970 – Regional Metropolitan Transportation Commission established.
 1971 – Your Black Muslim Bakery in business.
 1972 – 12th Street Oakland City Center (BART station), 19th Street Oakland (BART station), and MacArthur (BART station) open.
 1973 – Rockridge (BART station) opens.
 1974 – West Oakland (BART station) opens.
 1977 – Lionel Wilson becomes mayor.
 1985 – Alameda County Community Food Bank established.
 1988 – Oakland East Bay Symphony established.
 1989 – October 17: 1989 Loma Prieta earthquake.
 1990 – Population: 372,242.
 1991 – October 20: Oakland firestorm of 1991.
 1998 – City website online (approximate date).
 1999 – Jerry Brown becomes mayor.
 2000 – Allen v. City of Oakland lawsuit filed.

21st century

 2002 – Taoist Center opens.
 2003
 April 7: Anti-war protest.
 Women of Color Resource Center headquartered in Oakland.
 Urban Habitat headquartered in Oakland (approximate date).
 2004 – Middle Harbor Shoreline Park landscaped.
 2007
 East Bay Meditation Center opens.
 Ron Dellums becomes mayor.
 2008 – Cathedral of Christ the Light dedicated.
 2009
 January 1: BART Police shooting of Oscar Grant.
 March 21: 2009 shootings of Oakland police officers.
 Oakland Local begins publication.
 2010
 Ace Monster Toys founded.
 Population: city 390,724; metro 4,335,391.
 2011
 October 10: Occupy Oakland begins.
 Jean Quan becomes mayor.
 Sudoroom established.
 2012
 April 2: Oikos University shooting.
 Oakland Wiki begins publication.
 2014 – Oakland Police Beat begins publication.
 2016
 2016 Oakland warehouse fire

See also
 History of Oakland
 List of mayors of Oakland, California
 Timeline of the San Francisco Bay Area
 Timelines of other cities in the Northern California area of California: Fresno, Mountain View, Sacramento, San Francisco, San Jose

References

Bibliography

Published in the 19th century
 
 
 1890 ed.
 1892 ed.

Published in the 20th century
 
 1905 ed.
 1909 ed.
 1911 ed.
 1915 ed.
 1924 ed.
 
 
 
 
 1938 ed.
 1944 ed.

External links

 Items related to Oakland, various dates (via Digital Public Library of America)

 
Oakland, California-related lists
oakland